Robert W. Peterson (19 October 1937 – 4 November 2020) was a Canadian Liberal senator from Saskatchewan. He was appointed to the Senate by Prime Minister Paul Martin on March 24, 2005.

Peterson was an entrepreneur, professional engineer and community activist. He was the chief operating officer of Denro Holdings Ltd, and sat on the board of directors for General Properties Ltd and Cameco Corporation, a position he has held since 1994.

Peterson received a Bachelor of Science degree in Civil Engineering from the University of Saskatchewan.

Peterson died on 4 November 2020 in Regina.

References

External links
 CBC News article about new senators
 

1937 births
2020 deaths
Canadian senators from Saskatchewan
Liberal Party of Canada senators
21st-century Canadian politicians
University of Saskatchewan alumni